Siberia, Monamour is a 2011 Russian drama film directed by Vyacheslav Ross.

Plot 
The film takes place in a Siberian village. The old man and grandson are waiting for the return of the boy's father to the house. Husband and wife have three daughters, but they have nothing else in common. A man who has gone through two wars is trying to find himself. Characters will have to make a difficult choice, embark on the path of humanity and compassion.

Cast 
 Pyotr Zaychenko as Ivan
 Mikhail Protsko as Lyoshka
 Sergey Novikov as Uncle Yura
 Lidiya Bayrashevskaya as Anna
 Sonya Ross as Luba
 Nikolay Kozak as captain
 Maksim Emelyanov as Zheleznyak
 Sergei Puskepalis  as lieutenant colonel
 Yuriy Gumirov as major
 Sergey Tsepov as Zakhar

References

External links 
 

2011 films
2010s Russian-language films
Russian drama films
2011 drama films
Films set in Siberia